Springlake is a town in Lamb County, Texas, United States. The population was 108 at the 2010 census. The community is known for its agricultural processing and its yearly Independence Day parade and celebration culminating in a fireworks display headed by the Springlake Volunteer Fire Department. This celebration usually draws several thousand participants who come together to enjoy free food, a free live band, a bake auction, and fellowship.

It was the hometown of the late Speaker of the Texas House of Representatives, Bill W. Clayton.

Geography

Springlake is located at  (34.231217, –102.304707).

Demographics

As of the census of 2000, there were 135 people, 54 households, and 38 families residing in the town. The population density was 132.6 people per square mile (51.1/km2). There were 68 housing units at an average density of 66.8 per square mile (25.7/km2). The racial makeup of the town was 80.00% White, 0.74% African American, 19.26% from other races. Hispanic or Latino of any race were 33.33% of the population.

There were 54 households, out of which 33.3% had children under the age of 18 living with them, 63.0% were married couples living together, 5.6% had a female householder with no husband present, and 29.6% were non-families. 25.9% of all households were made up of individuals, and 7.4% had someone living alone who was 65 years of age or older. The average household size was 2.50 and the average family size was 3.08.

In the town, the population was spread out, with 30.4% under the age of 18, 4.4% from 18 to 24, 28.1% from 25 to 44, 23.0% from 45 to 64, and 14.1% who were 65 years of age or older. The median age was 38 years. For every 100 females, there were 101.5 males. For every 100 females age 18 and over, there were 100.0 males.

The median income for a household in the town was $20,000, and the median income for a family was $20,625. Males had a median income of $31,875 versus $13,125 for females. The per capita income for the town was $7,841. There were 34.3% of families and 42.0% of the population living below the poverty line, including 51.9% of under eighteens and 35.7% of those over 64.

Education
The Town of Springlake is served by the Springlake-Earth Independent School District.

See also
 Earth, Texas
 Plant X

References

Towns in Lamb County, Texas
Towns in Texas